José Luis "Pepe" Vendrell Bru (born 21 August 1980) is a Spanish tennis coach who is currently one of the coaches of Nicolás Álvarez Varona.

He coached countryman Roberto Bautista Agut from 2011 to 2021, helping him capture nine ATP Tour singles titles and reach a career-high ranking of World No. 9. Vendrell was said to be "like a brother, a friend and a psychologist" to Bautista Agut. The two ended their professional relationship on good terms.

In January 2021, Vendrell was appointed as the captain of the Spanish team at the ATP Cup. 

In the beginning of 2022, Vendrell worked at the JC Ferrero Equelite Sport Academy, located in Villena, Spain.

From April to September 2022, Vendrell coached Cristian Garín. Under his coaching, Garín reached his maiden Grand Slam quarterfinal at the 2022 Wimbledon Championships.

References

External links
Pepe Vendrell ATP coach profile

Spanish tennis coaches
1980 births
Living people
Sportspeople from Castellón de la Plana